The Fayetteville Angels were a minor league baseball team that existed from 1934 to 1940. They played in the Arkansas–Missouri League and its predecessor, the Arkansas State League. They were affiliated with the St. Louis Cardinals (1937), St. Louis Browns (1939) and Brooklyn Dodgers (1940).

The team was also known as the Educators and the Bears.

References

Baseball Reference
Encyclopedia of Arkansas

Baseball teams established in 1937
Defunct Arkansas-Missouri League teams
Defunct Arkansas State League teams
Brooklyn Dodgers minor league affiliates
St. Louis Browns minor league affiliates
St. Louis Cardinals minor league affiliates
Professional baseball teams in Arkansas
1934 establishments in Arkansas
1940 disestablishments in Arkansas
Baseball teams disestablished in 1940
Defunct minor league baseball teams
Defunct baseball teams in Arkansas